Chaulieu may refer to

People 
 Guillaume Amfrye de Chaulieu (1639–1720), French poet and wit
 Pierre Chaulieu, pseudonym  of  Cornelius Castoriadis (1922–1997), a Greek-French philosopher, social critic, economist, psychoanalyst, and author

Place 
 Chaulieu a commune in the Manche department in Normandy in north-western France
 Saint-Christophe-de-Chaulieu

Other 
 Louise de Chaulieu (1805–1835), character in Mémoires de deux jeunes mariées by  Honoré de Balzac